Luís Maia de Bittencourt Menezes (born 1 April 1897, date of death unknown) was a Brazilian footballer. He played in five matches for the Brazil national football team from 1916 to 1919. He was also part of Brazil's squad for the 1916 South American Championship.

References

External links
 

1897 births
Year of death missing
Brazilian footballers
Brazil international footballers
Place of birth missing
Association football forwards
Botafogo de Futebol e Regatas players